In enzymology, a (deoxy)nucleoside-phosphate kinase is an enzyme that catalyzes the chemical reaction

ATP + deoxynucleoside phosphate  ADP + deoxynucleoside diphosphate

Thus, the two substrates of this enzyme are ATP and deoxynucleoside phosphate, whereas its two products are ADP and deoxynucleoside diphosphate.

This enzyme belongs to the family of transferases, specifically those transferring phosphorus-containing groups (phosphotransferases) with a phosphate group as acceptor.  The systematic name of this enzyme class is ATP:deoxynucleoside-phosphate phosphotransferase. Other names in common use include deoxynucleoside monophosphate kinase, deoxyribonucleoside monophosphokinase, and deoxynucleoside-5'-monophosphate kinase.

Structural studies

References

EC 2.7.4
Enzymes of known structure